Jules Lermina (1839–1915) was a French writer. He began his career as a journalist in 1859. He was arrested for his socialist political opinions, and received Victor Hugo's support.

He published a number of Edgar Allan Poe-inspired collections, Histoires Incroyables [Incredible Tales] (1885), Nouvelles Histoires Incroyables [New Incredible Tales] (1888) and a short novel, L'Élixir de Vie [The Elixir of Life] (1890) (translated by Brian Stableford and included in Panic in Paris). Le Secret des Zippelius [The Secret of the Zippelius] (1893) (translated by Brian Stableford as The Secret of Zippelius (2011) ) featured the controlled disintegration of water. His two-volume La Bataille de Strasbourg [The Battle of Strasbourg] (1895) was one of the first novels on the theme of the yellow peril.

In L'Effrayante Aventure [Panic in Paris] (1910) (translated by Brian Stableford), Lermina used Bulwer-Lytton's vril-force to create a vril-powered flying machine. The novel also features the resurrection of prehistoric creatures frozen in ice in caverns under Paris. Mystère-Ville (1905) (translated by Brian Stableford as Mysteryville), written under the pseudonym of William Cobb, and illustrated by Albert Robida, was about Protestants who had fled France and created a secret, futuristic city in a hidden Chinese valley.

Lermina also penned a proto-Tarzan novel, To-Ho le Tueur d'Or (1905) (translated by Georges T. Dodds as To-Ho and the Gold Destroyers , two sequels to the popular classic The Count of Monte-Cristo: Le Fils de Monte-Cristo (1881) (that in English was divided in two books: The Wife of Monte Cristo and The Son of Monte Cristo), and Le Trésor de Monte-Cristo [The Treasure of Monte-Cristo] (1885); and Les Mystères de New York [The Mysteries of New York] (1874), also written under the pseudonym of William Cobb. He also created the indomitable Toto Fouinard, whose adventures were serialized in 1908–09.

Further reading

External links

 
 
 

1839 births
1915 deaths
French science fiction writers
French male novelists